The 1963 Los Angeles Dodgers were led by pitcher Sandy Koufax, who won both the Cy Young Award and the Most Valuable Player Award. The team went 99–63 to win the National League title by six games over the runner-up St. Louis Cardinals and beat the New York Yankees in four games to win the 1963 World Series, marking the first time that the Yankees were ever swept in the postseason.

Offseason 
 October 14, 1962: Norm Sherry and Dick Smith was purchased from the Dodgers by the New York Mets.
 November 26, 1962: Stan Williams was traded by the Dodgers to the New York Yankees for Bill Skowron.
 November 30, 1962: Tim Harkness and Larry Burright were traded by the Dodgers to the New York Mets for Bob Miller.
 January 24, 1963: Scott Breeden (minors) was traded by the Dodgers to the Cincinnati Reds for Don Zimmer.
 April 1, 1963: Duke Snider was purchased from the Dodgers by the New York Mets.

Regular season

Season standings

Record vs. opponents

Opening Day lineup

Notable transactions 
 June 24, 1963: Don Zimmer was purchased from the Dodgers by the Washington Senators.
 July 20, 1963: Ed Roebuck was traded by the Dodgers to the Washington Senators for Marv Breeding.

Roster

Game log

Regular season 

|-style=background:#cfc
| 1 || April 9 || 11:30a.m. PST || @ Cubs || W 5–1 || Drysdale (1–0) || Jackson (0–1) || – || 2:29 || 18,589 || 1–0 || W1
|-style=background:#cfc
| 2 || April 10 || 11:30a.m. PST || @ Cubs || W 2–1 || Koufax (1–0) || Buhl (0–1) || – || 2:20 || 2,673 || 2–0 || W2
|-style=background:#fbb
| 3 || April 11 || 11:30a.m. PST || @ Cubs || L 0–2 || Ellsworth (1–0) || Podres (0–1) || – || 1:59 || 3,735 || 2–1 || L1
|-style=background:#fbb
| 4 || April 12 || 7:00p.m. PST || @ Colt .45s || L 1–2  || Farrell (1–1) || Roebuck (0–1) || – || 3:09 || 12,044 || 2–2 || L2
|-style=background:#cfc
| 5 || April 13 || 7:00p.m. PST || @ Colt .45s || W 3–1 || Drysdale (2–0) || Brunet (0–1) || – || 2:13 || 15,164 || 3–2 || W1
|-style=background:#fbb
| 6 || April 14 || 1:30p.m. PST || @ Colt .45s || L 4–5 || Nottebart (1–0) || Koufax (1–1) || McMahon (1) || 2:31 || 10,180 || 3–3 || L1
|-style=background:#fbb
| 7 || April 16 || 8:00p.m. PST || Cubs || L 1–2  || McDaniel (1–0) || Roebuck (0–2) || Schultz (1) || 2:43 || 33,758 || 3–4 || L1
|-style=background:#cfc
| 8 || April 17 || 8:00p.m. PST || Cubs || W 1–0  || Perranoski (1–0) || Ellsworth (1–1) || – || 2:32 || 15,617 || 4–4 || W1
|-style=background:#fbb
| 9 || April 18 || 8:00p.m. PST || Cubs || L 1–5 || Hobbie (1–0) || Drysdale (2–1) || Elston (1) || 2:40 || 16,412 || 4–5 || L1
|-style=background:#cfc
| 10 || April 19 || 8:00p.m. PST || Colt .45s || W 2–0 || Koufax (2–1) || Farrell (1–2) || – || 1:48 || 15,654 || 5–5 || W1
|-style=background:#fbb
| 11 || April 20 || 1:00p.m. PST || Colt. 45s || L 6–9 || Nottebart (2–0) || Podres (0–2) || McMahon (3) || 2:44 || 17,110 || 5–6 || L1
|-style=background:#cfc
| 12 || April 21  || 1:00p.m. PST || Colt .45s || W 11–3 || Miller (1–0) || Cardinal (0–1) || Perranoski (1) || 3:02 || || 6–6 || W1
|-style=background:#cfc
| 13 || April 21  || 4:37p.m. PST || Colt .45s || W 6–5 || Roebuck (1–2) || Brunet (0–3) || – || 2:54 || 33,196 || 7–6 || W2
|-style=background:#fbb
| 14 || April 22 || 8:00p.m. PST || Braves || L 2–10 || Hendley (2–1) || Drysdale (2–2) || – || 2:42 || 18,795 || 7–7 || L1
|-style=background:#cfc
| 15 || April 23 || 8:00p.m. PST || Braves || W 2–1 || Perranoski (2–0) || Raymond (2–2) || – || 2:15 || 20,298 || 8–7 || W1
|-style=background:#cfc
| 16 || April 24 || 8:00p.m. PST || Reds || W 7–0 || Podres (1–2) || Owens (0–1) || – || 2:30 || 19,089 || 9–7 || W2
|-style=background:#cfc
| 17 || April 25 || 8:00p.m. PST || Reds || W 7–1 || Miller (2–0) || Jay (0–4) || – || 2:23 || 17,067 || 10–7 || W3
|-style=background:#fbb
| 18 || April 26 || 8:00p.m. PST || Cardinals || L 7–8 || Bauta (1–1) || Perranoski (2–1) || Shantz (1) || 2:41 || 24,959 || 10–8 || L1
|-style=background:#fbb
| 19 || April 27 || 8:00p.m. PST || Cardinals || L 0–3 || Washburn (4–0) || Sherry (0–1) || – || 2:15 || 33,949 || 10–9 || L2
|-style=background:#fbb
| 20 || April 28 || 1:00p.m. PDT || Cardinals || L 5–9 || Broglio (3–0) || Podres (1–3) || Taylor (1) || 2:56 || 36,245 || 10–10 || L3
|-style=background:#fbb
| 21 || April 29 || 5:00p.m. PDT || @ Mets || L 2–4 || Craig (2–2) || Miller (2–1) || – || 2:46 || 23,494 || 10–11 || L4
|-style=background:#bbb
| – || April 30 || || @ Mets || colspan=8 | Postponed (Rain) (Makeup date: July 10)
|-

|-style=background:#bbb
| – || May 1 || || @ Phillies || colspan=8 | Postponed (Rain) (Makeup date: September 13)
|-style=background:#cfc
| 22 || May 2 || 5:05p.m. PDT || @ Phillies || W 3–2 || Perranoski (3–1) || Mahaffey (2–3) || – || 2:16 || 11,288 || 11–11 || W1
|-style=background:#fbb
| 23 || May 3 || 5:15p.m. PDT || @ Pirates || L 2–13 || McBean (2–1) || Sherry (0–2) || – || 2:21 || 16,960 || 11–12 || L1
|-style=background:#fbb
| 24 || May 4 || 10:35a.m. PDT || @ Pirates || L 0–5 || Schwall (2–0) || Miller (2–2) || – || 2:05 || 12,037 || 11–13 || L2
|-style=background:#cfc
| 25 || May 5 || 11:05a.m. PDT || @ Pirates || W 7–3 || Perranoski (4–1) || Law (0–1) || – || 2:21 || 18,743 || 12–13 || W1
|-style=background:#fbb
| 26 || May 6 || 10:35a.m. PDT || @ Pirates || L 4–7 || Gibbon (2–0) || Drysdale (2–3) || Face (4) || 2:41 || 5,376 || 12–14 || L1
|-style=background:#cfc
| 27 || May 7 || 6:00p.m. PDT || @ Cardinals || W 11–1 || Koufax (3–1) || Washburn (5–1) || Rowe (1) || 2:23 || 16,609 || 13–14 || W1
|-style=background:#cfc
| 28 || May 8 || 6:00p.m. PDT || @ Cardinals || W 11–5 || Perranoski (5–1) || Shantz (1–2) || Scott (1) || 2:50 || 10,918 || 14–14 || W2
|-style=background:#fbb
| 29 || May 9 || 6:00p.m. PDT || @ Cardinals || L 7–10 || Gibson (1–1) || Richert (0–1) || Fanok (1) || 2:56 || 10,762 || 14–15 || L1
|-style=background:#cfc
| 30 || May 10 || 8:00p.m. PDT || Giants || W 2–1 || Drysdale (3–3) || Sanford (5–2) || – || 2:00 || 50,407 || 15–15 || W1
|-style=background:#cfc
| 31 || May 11 || 8:00p.m. PDT || Giants || W 8–0 || Koufax (4–1) || Marichal (4–3) || – || 2:13 || 49,807 || 16–15 || W2
|-style=background:#cfc
| 32 || May 12 || 1:00p.m. PDT || Giants || W 6–5 || Calmus (1–0) || Fisher (3–3) || Perranoski (2) || 2:38 || 43,964 || 17–15 || W3
|-style=background:#fbb
| 33 || May 14 || 8:00p.m. PDT || Phillies || L 1–5 || McLish (1–2) || Drysdale (3–4) || – || 2:34 || 19,294 || 17–16 || L1
|-style=background:#cfc
| 34 || May 15 || 8:00p.m. PDT || Phillies || W 3–2  || Koufax (5–1) || Klippstein (1–2) || – || 3:08 || 20,512 || 18–16 || W1
|-style=background:#cfc
| 35 || May 16 || 8:00p.m. PDT || Pirates || W 1–0 || Podres (2–3) || Schwall (2–2) || – || 1:50 || 21,287 || 19–16 || W2
|-style=background:#cfc
| 36 || May 17 || 8:00p.m. PDT || Pirates || W 9–3 || Miller (3–2) || Gibbon (2–1) || Scott (2) || 2:39 || 34,216 || 20–16 || W3
|-style=background:#cfc
| 37 || May 18 || 1:00p.m. PDT || Pirates || W 6–4 || Drysdale (4–4) || Law (1–2) || – || 2:31 || 21,140 || 21–16 || W4
|-style=background:#cfc
| 38 || May 19  || 1:00p.m. PDT || Mets || W 1–0 || Koufax (6–1) || Craig (2–6) || – || 1:57 || || 22–16 || W5
|-style=background:#cfc
| 39 || May 19  || 3:32p.m. PDT || Mets || W 4–2  || Perranoski (6–1) || MacKenzie (3–1) || – || 3:45 || 42,541 || 23–16 || W6
|-style=background:#cfc
| 40 || May 21 || 8:00p.m. PDT || Mets || W 4–2 || Podres (3–3) || Cisco (1–4) || – || 2:17 || 21,108 || 24–16 || W7
|-style=background:#cfc
| 41 || May 22 || 8:00p.m. PDT || Mets || W 7–3 || Drysdale (5–4) || Willey (4–3) || – || 2:10 || 22,714 || 25–16 || W8
|-style=background:#fbb
| 42 || May 24 || 8:15p.m. PDT || @ Giants || L 1–7 || Marichal (6–3) || Koufax (6–2) || – || 2:05 || 40,676 || 25–17 || L1
|-style=background:#fbb
| 43 || May 25 || 1:00p.m. PDT || @ Giants || L 2–6 || O'Dell (7–0) || Podres (3–4) || Larsen (1) || 2:13 || 39,858 || 25–18 || L2
|-style=background:#cfc
| 44 || May 26 || 1:00p.m. PDT || @ Giants || W 4–3  || Drysdale (6–4) || Larsen (0–2) || – || 2:50 || 41,668 || 26–18 || W1
|-style=background:#cfc
| 45 || May 28 || 6:00p.m. PDT || @ Braves || W 7–0 || Koufax (7–2) || Lemaster (2–3) || – || 2:33 || 4,573 || 27–18 || W2
|-style=background:#fff
| 46 || May 29 || 6:00p.m. PDT || @ Braves || T 3–3  || – || – || – || 2:02 || 11,968 || 27–18–1 || T1
|-style=background:#fbb
| 47 || May 30 || 6:00p.m. PDT || @ Braves || L 4–7 || Spahn (7–3) || Drysdale (6–5) || Raymond (3) || 2:32 || 12,403 || 27–19–1 || L1
|-style=background:#fbb
| 48 || May 31 || 6:05p.m. PDT || @ Reds || L 4–7 || Maloney (7–2) || Roebuck (1–3) || Worthington (4) || 2:45 || 14,171 || 27–20–1 || L2
|-

|-style=background:#fbb
| 49 || June 1 || 6:05p.m. PDT || @ Reds || L 0–1 || Jay (2–8) || Koufax (7–3) || – || 2:16 || 23,737 || 27–21–1 || L3
|-style=background:#fbb
| 50 || June 2 || 11:30a.m. PDT || @ Reds || L 2–5 || O'Toole (9–3) || Podres (3–5) || Henry (5) || 2:30 || 18,682 || 27–22–1 || L4
|-style=background:#fbb
| 51 || June 3 || 7:00p.m. PDT || @ Colt .45s || L 1–2 || Farrell (5–6) || Drysdale (6–6) || – || 1:57 || 15,659 || 27–23–1 || L5
|-style=background:#cfc
| 52 || June 4 || 7:00p.m. PDT || @ Colt. 45s || W 2–1 || Miller (4–2) || Drott (2–3) || Perranoski (3) || 2:21 || 10,429 || 28–23–1 || W1
|-style=background:#cfc
| 53 || June 5 || 7:00p.m. PDT || @ Colt. 45s || W 5–1 || Koufax (8–3) || Johnson (3–8) || – || 2:24 || 15,365 || 29–23–1 || W2
|-style=background:#cfc
| 54 || June 7 || 11:30a.m. PDT || @ Cubs || W 4–1 || Drysdale (7–6) || Toth (1–3) || – || 2:02 || 12,741 || 30–23–1 || W3
|-style=background:#cfc
| 55 || June 8 || 11:30a.m. PDT || @ Cubs || W 9–5 || Perranoski (7–1) || Elston (2–1) || – || 2:36 || 26,577 || 31–23–1 || W4
|-style=background:#cfc
| 56 || June 9 || 11:30a.m. PDT || @ Cubs || W 11–8 || Sherry (1–2) || Ellsworth (8–4) || – || 2:44 || 35,743 || 32–23–1 || W5
|-style=background:#fbb
| 57 || June 10 || 8:00p.m. PDT || Giants || W 7–3 || Larsen (1–3) || Perranoski (7–2) || – || 3:12 || 52,993 || 32–24–1 || L1
|-style=background:#fbb
| 58 || June 11 || 8:00p.m. PDT || Giants || W 3–0 || Marichal (9–3) || Drysdale (7–7) || – || 2:10 || 53,436 || 32–25–1 || L2
|-style=background:#cfc
| 59 || June 12 || 8:00p.m. PDT || Colt .45s || W 9–1 || Podres (4–5) || Nottebart (5–4) || – || 2:08 || 17,389 || 33–25–1 || W1
|-style=background:#cfc
| 60 || June 13 || 8:00p.m. PDT || Colt .45s || W 3–0 || Koufax (9–3) || Bruce (3–4) || – || 2:07 || 21,873 || 34–25–1 || W2
|-style=background:#fbb
| 61 || June 14 || 8:00p.m. PDT || Cubs || L 1–4 || Hobbie (2–5) || Miller (4–3) || – || 2:36 || 32,648 || 34–26–1 || L1
|-style=background:#cfc
| 62 || June 15 || 1:00p.m. PDT || Cubs || W 4–1 || Drysdale (8–7) || Jackson (7–6) || – || 1:59 || 22,179 || 35–26–1 || W1
|-style=background:#fbb
| 63 || June 16  || 1:00p.m. PDT || Cubs || L 3–8 || Buhl (6–5) || Podres (4–6) || – || 2:17 || || 35–27–1 || L1
|-style=background:#cfc
| 64 || June 16  || 3:52p.m. PDT || Cubs || W 2–0 || Willhite (1–0) || Toth (1–4) || – || 1:54 || 45,239 || 36–27–1 || W1
|-style=background:#cfc
| 65 || June 17 || 8:15p.m. PDT || @ Giants || W 2–0 || Koufax (10–3) || O'Dell (9–3) || – || 2:13 || 36,818 || 37–27–1 || W2
|-style=background:#fbb
| 66 || June 18 || 8:15p.m. PDT || @ Giants || L 3–9 || Sanford (9–5) || Miller (4–4) || – || 2:21 || 37,780 || 37–28–1 || L1
|-style=background:#fbb
| 67 || June 19 || 1:00p.m. PDT || @ Giants || L 3–8 || Marichal (11–3) || Drysdale (8–8) || Pierce (3) || 2:32 || 41,384 || 37–29–1 || L2
|-style=background:#cfc
| 68 || June 21 || 6:00p.m. PDT || @ Cardinals || W 5–3 || Koufax (11–3) || Simmons (7–3) || Perranoski (4) || 2:32 || 28,423 || 38–29–1 || W1
|-style=background:#fbb
| 69 || June 22 || 11:30a.m. PDT || @ Cardinals || L 1–2 || Gibson (6–3) || Willhite (1–1) || Taylor (4) || 2:32 || 20,875 || 38–30–1 || L1
|-style=background:#cfc
| 70 || June 23 || 11:30a.m. PDT || @ Cardinals || W 4–3 || Miller (5–4) || Broglio (8–3) || Perranoski (5) || 2:41 || 26,553 || 39–30–1 || W1
|-style=background:#cfc
| 71 || June 24 || 6:05p.m. PDT || @ Reds || W 5–4 || Drysdale (9–8) || Jay (3–11) || Perranoski (6) || 2:35 || 17,273 || 40–30–1 || W2
|-style=background:#cfc
| 72 || June 25 || 6:05p.m. PDT || @ Reds || W 4–1 || Koufax (12–3) || O'Toole (13–4) || – || 2:22 || 22,831 || 41–30–1 || W3
|-style=background:#cfc
| 73 || June 26 || 6:05p.m. PDT || @ Reds || W 5–2 || Perranoski (8–2) || Maloney (11–3) || – || 2:32 || 19,122 || 42–30–1 || W4
|-style=background:#fbb
| 74 || June 28 || 8:00p.m. PDT || Braves || L 0–1 || Spahn (11–3) || Drysdale (9–9) || – || 2:02 || 44,894 || 42–31–1 || L1
|-style=background:#cfc
| 75 || June 29 || 8:00p.m. PDT || Braves || W 6–5  || Perranoski (9–2) || Shaw (3–6) || – || 3:06 || 44,075 || 43–31–1 || W1
|-style=background:#fbb
| 76 || June 30 || 1:00p.m. PDT || Braves || L 0–7 || Cloninger (4–4) || Willhite (1–2) || – || 2:04 || 29,953 || 43–32–1 || L1
|-

|-style=background:#cfc
| 77 || July 1 || 8:00p.m. PDT || Braves || W 2–1 || Podres (5–6) || Sadowski (0–2) || – || 1:58 || 21,603 || 44–32–1 || W1
|-style=background:#cfc
| 78 || July 2 || 8:00p.m. PDT || Cardinals || W 1–0 || Drysdale (10–9) || Simmons (7–4) || – || 1:48 || 39,824 || 45–32–1 || W1
|-style=background:#cfc
| 79 || July 3 || 8:00p.m. PDT || Cardinals || W 5–0 || Koufax (13–3) || Gibson (7–4) || – || 1:53 || 51,898 || 46–32–1 || W2
|-style=background:#cfc
| 80 || July 4 || 8:00p.m. PDT || Cardinals || W 10–7 || Roebuck (2–3) || Broglio (9–4) || Perranoski (7) || 3:02 || 30,726 || 47–32–1 || W3
|-style=background:#cfc
| 81 || July 5 || 8:00p.m. PDT || Reds || W 1–0 || Podres (6–6) || O'Toole (13–6) || – || 1:35 || 35,536 || 48–32–1 || W5
|-style=background:#fbb
| 82 || July 6 || 1:00p.m. PDT || Reds || L 1–3 || Maloney (13–3) || Drysdale (10–10) || – || 2:23 || 27,793 || 48–33–1 || L1
|-style=background:#cfc
| 83 || July 7  || 1:00p.m. PDT || Reds || W 4–0 || Koufax (14–3) || Purkey (3–5) || – || 2:02 || || 49–33–1 || W1
|-style=background:#cfc
| 84 || July 7  || 3:37p.m. PDT || Reds || W 3–1 || Willhite (2–2) || Tsitouris (4–3) || Perranoski (8) || 2:07 || 53,856 || 50–33–1 || W2
|-style=background:#bbbfff
| – || July 9 || 10:00a.m. PDT || 34th All-Star Game || colspan=8 | National League vs. American League (Cleveland Municipal Stadium, Cleveland, Ohio)
|-style=background:#cfc
| 85 || July 10 || 5:00p.m. PDT || @ Mets || W 1–0 || Podres (7–6) || Willey (6–8) || – || 1:45 || 17,106 || 51–33–1 || W3
|-style=background:#cfc
| 86 || July 11 || 5:00p.m. PDT || @ Mets || W 4–3 || Drysdale (11–10) || Craig (2–14) || Perranoski (9) || 2:16 || 23,890 || 52–33–1 || W4
|-style=background:#cfc
| 87 || July 12 || 5:00p.m. PDT || @ Mets || W 6–0 || Koufax (15–3) || Jackson (6–10) || – || 2:19 || 34,889 || 53–33–1 || W5
|-style=background:#cfc
| 88 || July 13 || 11:00a.m. PDT || @ Mets || W 11–2 || Miller (6–4) || Stallard (3–7) || – || 2:51 || 21,461 || 54–33–1 || W6
|-style=background:#cfc
| 89 || July 14 || 10:35a.m. PDT || @ Phillies || W 3–2  || Podres (8–6) || McLish (9–5) || – || 1:37 || 23,542 || 55–33–1 || W7
|-style=background:#fbb
| 90 || July 15 || 5:05p.m. PDT || @ Phillies || L 4–5  || Baldschun (7–4) || Roebuck (2–4) || – || 3:01 || 19,488 || 55–34–1 || L1
|-style=background:#cfc
| 91 || July 16  || 3:05p.m. PDT || @ Phillies || W 5–2 || Koufax (16–3) || Mahaffey (6–10) || – || 2:11 || || 56–34–1 || W1
|-style=background:#fbb
| 92 || July 16  || 5:51p.m. PDT || @ Phillies || L 2–10 || Green (2–3) || Willhite (2–3) || – || 2:18 || 35,353 || 56–35–1 || L1
|-style=background:#cfc
| 93 || July 17 || 5:15p.m. PDT || @ Pirates || W 3–2 || Miller (7–4) || Law (4–4) || Perranoski (10) || 2:39 || 16,658 || 57–35–1 || W1
|-style=background:#cfc
| 94 || July 18 || 5:15p.m. PDT || @ Pirates || W 10–5 || Podres (9–6) || Francis (3–4) || Sherry (1) || 3:03 || 15,883 || 58–35–1 || W2
|-style=background:#cfc
| 95 || July 19 || 6:00p.m. PDT || @ Braves || W 4–2 || Drysdale (12–10) || Hendley (5–6) || – || 2:13 || 18,547 || 59–35–1 || W3
|-style=background:#cfc
| 96 || July 20 || 11:30a.m. PDT || @ Braves || W 5–4 || Perranoski (10–2) || Raymond (4–5) || – || 2:42 || 11,804 || 60–35–1 || W4
|-style=background:#fbb
| 97 || July 21  || 11:00a.m. PDT || @ Braves || L 2–7 || Sadowski (1–4) || Miller (7–5) || Shaw (7) || 2:30 || || 60–36–1 || L1
|-style=background:#fbb
| 98 || July 21  || 2:05p.m. PDT || @ Braves || L 7–13 || Cloninger (7–6) || Sherry (1–3) || – || 3:07 || 28,534 || 60–37–1 || L2
|-style=background:#cfc
| 99 || July 23 || 8:00p.m. PDT || Pirates || W 6–0 || Podres (10–6) || Friend (11–9) || – || 2:26 || 33,167 || 61–37–1 || W1
|-style=background:#cfc
| 100 || July 24 || 8:00p.m. PDT || Pirates || W 5–1 || Drysdale (13–10) || Francis (3–5) || – || 2:09 || 30,462 || 62–37–2 || W2
|-style=background:#fbb
| 101 || July 25 || 8:00p.m. PDT || Pirates || L 2–6 || Sisk (1–0) || Koufax (16–4) || – || 2:19 || 41,154 || 62–38–1 || L1
|-style=background:#fbb
| 102 || July 26 || 8:00p.m. PDT || Phillies || L 5–6 || Short (3–8) || Miller (7–6) || Baldschun (11)  || 2:48 || 30,589 || 62–39–1 || L2
|-style=background:#fbb
| 103 || July 27 || 8:00p.m. PDT || Phillies || L 1–4 || Bennett (3–0) || Podres (10–7) || Klippstein (6) || 2:26 || 36,262 || 62–40–1 || L3
|-style=background:#fbb
| 104 || July 28 || 1:00p.m. PDT || Phillies || L 4–7 || Boozer (2–2) || Drysdale (13–11) || – || 2:38 || 32,996 || 62–41–1 || L4
|-style=background:#cfc
| 105 || July 29 || 8:00p.m. PDT || Phillies || W 6–2 || Koufax (17–4) || McLish (10–6) || – || 2:14 || 32,835 || 63–41–1 || W1
|-style=background:#fbb
| 106 || July 30 || 8:00p.m. PDT || Mets || L 1–5 || Stallard (4–9) || Miller (7–7) || – || 2:21 || 24,515 || 63–42–1 || L1
|-style=background:#cfc
| 107 || July 31 || 8:00p.m. PDT || Mets || W 5–3 || Richert (1–1) || Craig (2–19) || Perranoski (11) || 2:20 || 24,589 || 64–42–1 || W1
|-

|-style=background:#fbb
| 108 || August 2 || 7:00p.m. PDT || @ Colt .45s || L 1–4 || Farrell (9–8) || Drysdale (13–12) || – || 1:55 || 13,054 || 64–43–1 || L1
|-style=background:#cfc
| 109 || August 3 || 7:00p.m. PDT || @ Colt .45s || W 2–0 || Koufax (18–4) || Bruce (5–8) || – || 2:00 || 25,473 || 65–43–1 || W1
|-style=background:#cfc
| 110 || August 4 || 1:30p.m. PDT || @ Colt .45s || W 4–0 || Podres (11–7) || Johnson (6–15) || Sherry (2) || 2:09 || 14,237 || 66–43–1 || W2
|-style=background:#cfc
| 111 || August 6 || 11:30a.m. PDT || @ Cubs || W 4–1 || Drysdale (14–12) || Jackson (12–10) || – || 1:58 || 15,276 || 67–43–1 || W3
|-style=background:#cfc
| 112 || August 7 || 11:30a.m. PDT || @ Cubs || W 3–1  || Perranoski (11–2) || McDaniel (7–5) || – || 2:53 || 27,184 || 68–43–1 || W4
|-style=background:#fbb
| 113 || August 8 || 11:30a.m. PDT || @ Cubs || L 4–5  || McDaniel (8–5) || Sherry (1–4) || – || 2:18 || 16,408 || 68–44–1 || L1
|-style=background:#fbb
| 114 || August 9 || 6:05p.m. PDT || @ Reds || L 4–8 || Nuxhall (10–5) || Podres (11–8) || Worthington (7) || 2:50 || 18,178 || 68–45–1 || L2
|-style=background:#cfc
| 115 || August 10 || 6:05p.m. PDT || @ Reds || W 10–3 || Drysdale (15–12) || Purkey (5–8) || – || 2:47 || 29,034 || 69–45–1 || W1
|-style=background:#fbb
| 116 || August 11 || 12Noon PDT || @ Reds || L 4–9 || O'Toole (15–9) || Koufax (18–5) || Worthington (8) || 2:25 || 26,195 || 69–46–1 || L1
|-style=background:#fbb
| 117 || August 13 || 6:00p.m. PDT || @ Braves || L 3–4 || Spahn (14–5) || Miller (7–8) || – || 2:13 || 13,529 || 69–47–1 || L1
|-style=background:#fbb
| 118 || August 14 || 6:00p.m. PDT || @ Braves || L 3–5 || Sadowski (2–5) || Drysdale (15–13) || Lemaster (1) || 2:32 || 13,429 || 69–48–1 || L2
|-style=background:#cfc
| 119 || August 15 || 6:00p.m. PDT || @ Braves || W 7–5 || Perranoski (12–2) || Fischer (4–3) || – || 2:43 || 13,425 || 70–48–1 || W1
|-style=background:#cfc
| 120 || August 16 || 5:00p.m. PDT || @ Mets || W 9–7 || Perranoski (13–2) || Bearnarth (2–4) || Miller (1) || 2:53 || 31,405 || 71–48–1 || W2
|-style=background:#cfc
| 121 || August 17 || 11:00a.m. PDT || @ Mets || W 3–2 || Koufax (19–5) || Stallard (6–11) || Perranoski (12) || 2:45 || 21,841 || 72–48–1 || W3
|-style=background:#cfc
| 122 || August 18  || 11:05a.m. PDT || @ Mets || W 7–0 || Drysdale (16–13) || Jackson (8–15) || – || 2:25 || || 73–48–1 || W4
|-style=background:#cfc
| 123 || August 18  || 2:05p.m. PDT || @ Mets || W 3–2 || Calmus (2–0) || Willey (7–11) || – || 2:36 || 46,184 || 74–48–1 || W5
|-style=background:#cfc
| 124 || August 20 || 8:00p.m. PDT || Cardinals || W 7–5 || Miller (8–8) || Burdette (8–10) || – || 2:45 || 50,122 || 75–48–1 || W6
|-style=background:#cfc
| 125 || August 21 || 8:00p.m. PDT || Cardinals || W 2–1  || Sherry (2–4) || Taylor (7–5) || – || 3:48 || 54,125 || 76–48–1 || W7
|-style=background:#fbb
| 126 || August 22 || 8:00p.m. PDT || Cardinals || L 2–3 || Broglio (14–8) || Drysdale (16–14) || Jones (2) || 2:32 || 48,569 || 76–49–1 || L1
|-style=background:#fbb
| 127 || August 23 || 8:00p.m. PDT || Braves || L 1–6 || Spahn (16–5) || Calmus (2–1) || – || 2:30 || 36,013 || 76–50–1 || L2
|-style=background:#fbb
| 128 || August 24 || 8:00p.m. PDT || Braves || L 1–2 || Lemaster (10–8) || Podres (11–9) || Shaw (12) || 2:34 || 36,479 || 76–51–1 || L3
|-style=background:#cfc
| 129 || August 25 || 1:00p.m. PDT || Braves || W 2–1 || Miller (9–8) || Shaw (5–10) || – || 2:29 || 32,137 || 77–51–1 || W1
|-style=background:#fbb
| 130 || August 26 || 8:00p.m. PDT || Reds || L 1–3 || O'Toole (16–11) || Drysdale (16–15) || – || 2:09 || 36,694 || 77–52–1 || L1
|-style=background:#cfc
| 131 || August 27 || 8:00p.m. PDT || Reds || W 3–2 || Richert (2–1) || Purkey (6–9) || Perranoski (13) || 2:14 || 28,070 || 78–52–1 || W1
|-style=background:#fbb
| 132 || August 28 || 8:00p.m. PDT || Reds || L 5–9 || Maloney (19–6) || Podres (11–10) || Jay (1) || 2:32 || 28,921 || 78–53–1 || L1
|-style=background:#cfc
| 133 || August 29 || 8:00p.m. PDT || Giants || W 11–1 || Koufax (20–5) || Pierce (3–10) || – || 2:38 || 54,978 || 79–53–1 || W1
|-style=background:#cfc
| 134 || August 30 || 8:00p.m. PDT || Giants || W 3–1 || Drysdale (17–15) || Marichal (19–8) || – || 2:34 || 54,843 || 80–53–1 || W2
|-style=background:#fbb
| 135 || August 31 || 8:00p.m. PDT || Giants || L 3–4  || Larsen (6–5) || Sherry (2–5) || – || 3:25 || 54,858 || 80–54–1 || L1
|-

|-style=background:#cfc
| 136 || September 1 || 1:00p.m. PDT || Giants || W 5–3 || Calmus (3–1) || Larsen (6–6) || Podres (1) || 3:42 || 54,263 || 81–54–1 || W1
|-style=background:#cfc
| 137 || September 2  || 1:00p.m. PDT || Colt .45s || W 7–3 || Koufax (21–5) || Farrell (10–12) || – || 2:16 || || 82–54–1 || W2
|-style=background:#cfc
| 138 || September 2  || 3:51p.m. PDT || Colt .45s || W 7–1 || Podres (12–10) || Zachary (0–2) || Perranoski (14) || 2:14 || 39,378 || 83–54–1 || W3
|-style=background:#cfc
| 139 || September 3 || 8:00p.m. PDT || Colt .45s || W 4–3  || Perranoski (14–2) || Farrell (10–13) || – || 2:24 || 23,235 || 84–54–1 || W4
|-style=background:#fbb
| 140 || September 4 || 8:00p.m. PDT || Cubs || L 1–2  || McDaniel (11–6) || Rowe (0–1) || – || 3:23 || 21,840 || 84–55–1 || L1
|-style=background:#cfc
| 141 || September 5 || 8:00p.m. PDT || Cubs || W 4–0 || Richert (3–1) || Buhl (9–13) || Sherry (3) || 2:23 || 35,256 || 85–55–1 || W1
|-style=background:#cfc
| 142 || September 6 || 8:15p.m. PDT || @ Giants || W 5–2 || Koufax (22–5) || O'Dell (12–7) || Perranoski (15) || 2:35 || 38,161 || 86–55–1 || W2
|-style=background:#fbb
| 143 || September 7 || 1:00p.m. PDT || @ Giants || L 3–5 || Marichal (21–8) || Drysdale (17–16) || – || 2:04 || 36,879 || 86–56–1 || L1
|-style=background:#fbb
| 144 || September 8 || 1:00p.m. PDT || @ Giants || L 4–5 || Larsen (7–6) || Perranoski (14–3) || – || 2:45 || 38,569 || 86–57–1 || L2
|-style=background:#cfc
| 145 || September 10 || 5:15p.m. PDT || @ Pirates || W 4–2 || Koufax (23–5) || Cardwell (13–14) || – || 2:19 || 11,152 || 87–57–1 || W5
|-style=background:#cfc
| 146 || September 11 || 5:15p.m. PDT || @ Pirates || W 9–4 || Richert (4–1) || Veale (2–2) || Perranoski (16) || 2:32 || 8,514 || 88–57–1 || W6
|-style=background:#cfc
| 147 || September 12 || 5:15p.m. PDT || @ Pirates || W 5–3 || Podres (13–10) || Friend (16–15) || Perranoski (17) || 2:04 || 2,644 || 89–57–1 || W7
|-style=background:#fbb
| 148 || September 13  || 3:05p.m. PDT || @ Phillies || L 2–3 || Short (7–11) || Sherry (2–6) || – || 2:21 || || 89–58–1 || L1
|-style=background:#cfc
| 149 || September 13  || 6:01p.m. PDT || @ Phillies || W 2–1 || Perranoski (15–3) || Bennett (8–4) || – || 2:32 || 26,024 || 90–58–1 || W1
|-style=background:#cfc
| 150 || September 14 || 10:35a.m. PDT || @ Phillies || W 5–1 || Richert (5–1) || Boozer (2–4) || – || 2:24 || 10,410 || 91–58–1 || W2
|-style=background:#fbb
| 151 || September 15 || 10:35a.m. PDT || @ Phillies || L 1–6 || Green (6–4) || Drysdale (17–17) || – || 2:09 || 16,796 || 91–59–1 || L1
|-style=background:#cfc
| 152 || September 16 || 6:00p.m. PDT || @ Cardinals || W 3–1 || Podres (14–10) || Shantz (6–4) || Perranoski (18) || 2:34 || 32,442 || 92–59–1 || W1
|-style=background:#cfc
| 153 || September 17 || 6:00p.m. PDT || @ Cardinals || W 4–0 || Koufax (24–5) || Simmons (15–8) || – || 1:51 || 30,450 || 93–59–1 || W2
|-style=background:#cfc
| 154 || September 18 || 6:00p.m. PDT || @ Cardinals || W 6–5  || Perranoski (16–3) || Burdette (9–12) || – || 3:44 || 25,975 || 94–59–1 || W3
|-style=background:#cfc
| 155 || September 20 || 8:00p.m. PDT || Pirates || W 2–0 || Drysdale (18–17) || Schwall (6–12) || – || 2:17 || 40,476 || 95–59–1 || W4
|-style=background:#cfc
| 156 || September 21 || 8:00p.m. PDT || Pirates || W 5–3 || Miller (10–8) || Sisk (1–1) || – || 2:44 || 48,038 || 96–59–1 || W5
|-style=background:#fbb
| 157 || September 22 || 1:00p.m. PDT || Pirates || L 0–4 || Veale (4–2) || Podres (14–11) || Face (16) || 2:20 || 36,878 || 96–60–1 || L1
|-style=background:#cfc
| 158 || September 24 || 8:00p.m. PDT || Mets || W 4–1 || Drysdale (19–17) || Stallard (6–17) || Perranoski (19) || 2:26 || 27,988 || 97–60–1 || W1
|-style=background:#cfc
| 159 || September 25 || 8:00p.m. PDT || Mets || W 1–0 || Koufax (25–5) || Craig (5–22) || Perranoski (20) || 2:08 || 24,181 || 98–60–1 || W2
|-style=background:#cfc
| 160 || September 26 || 8:00p.m. PDT || Mets || W 5–4 || Rowe (1–1) || Cisco (7–15) || Perranoski (21) || 2:15 || 18,546 || 99–60–1 || W3
|-style=background:#fbb
| 161 || September 27 || 8:00p.m. PDT || Phillies || L 3–5 || Boozer (3–4) || Richert (5–2) || Duren (2) || 2:40 || 34,689 || 99–61–1 || L1
|-style=background:#fbb
| 162 || September 28 || 8:00p.m. PDT || Phillies || L 3–12 || Bennett (9–5) || Podres (14–12) || – || 2:21 || 37,212 || 99–62–1 || L2
|-style=background:#fbb
| 163 || September 29 || 1:00p.m. PDT || Phillies || L 1–3 || Short (9–12) || Richert (5–3) || – || 2:31 || 19,237 || 99–63–1 || L3
|-

|- style="text-align:center;"
| Legend:       = Win       = Loss       = PostponementBold = Dodgers team member

Postseason Game log 

|-style=background:#cfc
| 1 || October 2 || 10:00a.m. PDT || @ Yankees || W 5–2 || Koufax (1–0) || Ford (0–1) || – || 2:09 || 69,000 || 1–0 || W1
|-style=background:#cfc
| 2 || October 3 || 10:00a.m. PDT || @ Yankees || W 4–1 || Podres (1–0) || Downing (0–1) || Perranoski (1) || 2:13 || 66,455 || 2–0 || W2
|-style=background:#cfc
| 3 || October 5 || 1:00p.m. PDT || Yankees || W 1–0 || Drysdale (1–0) || Bouton (0–1) || – || 2:05 || 55,912 || 3–0 || W3
|-style=background:#cfc
| 4 || October 6 || 1:00p.m. PDT || Yankees || W 2–1 || Koufax (2–0) || Ford (0–2) || – || 1:50 || 55,912 || 4–0 || W4
|-

|- style="text-align:center;"
| Legend:       = Win       = Loss       = PostponementBold = Dodgers team member

Player stats

Batting 
Stats in bold are the team leaders.

Starters by position 
Note: Pos = Position; G = Games played; PA = Plate appearances; AB = At bats; R = Runs scored; H = Hits; 2B = Doubles hit; 3B = Triples hit; HR = Home runs; RBI = Runs batted in; SB = Stolen bases; CS = Caught stealing; BB = Walks; SO = Strikeouts; Avg. = Batting average; OBP = On-base percentage; SLG = Slugging; OPS = On Base + Slugging; TB = Total bases; GDP = Grounded into double play; HBP = Hit by pitch; SH = Sacrifice hits; SF = Sacrifice flies; IBB = Intentional base on balls

Other batters 
Note: G = Games played; PA = Plate appearances; AB = At bats; R = Runs scored; H = Hits; 2B = Doubles hit; 3B = Triples hit; HR = Home runs; RBI = Runs batted in; SB = Stolen bases; CS = Caught stealing; BB = Walks; SO = Strikeouts; Avg. = Batting average; OBP = On-base percentage; SLG = Slugging; OPS = On Base + Slugging; TB = Total bases; GDP = Grounded into double play; HBP = Hit by pitch; SH = Sacrifice hits; SF = Sacrifice flies; IBB = Intentional base on balls

Pitchers batting 
Note: G = Games played; PA = Plate appearances; AB = At bats; R = Runs scored; H = Hits; 2B = Doubles hit; 3B = Triples hit; HR = Home runs; RBI = Runs batted in; SB = Stolen bases; CS = Caught stealing; BB = Walks; SO = Strikeouts; Avg. = Batting average; OBP = On-base percentage; SLG = Slugging; OPS = On Base + Slugging; TB = Total bases; GDP = Grounded into double play; HBP = Hit by pitch; SH = Sacrifice hits; SF = Sacrifice flies; IBB = Intentional base on balls

Pitching 
List does not include position players.  Stats in bold are the team leaders.

Starting pitchers 
Note: W = Wins; L = Losses; W-L% = Win-Loss Percentage; ERA = Earned run average; G = Games pitched; GS = Games started; GF = Games finished; CG = Complete game; SHO = Shutouts; SV = Saves; IP = Innings pitched; HA = Hits allowed; RA = Runs allowed; ER = Earned runs allowed; HRA = Home runs allowed; BB = Base on Balls; IBB = Intentional base on balls; SO = Strikeouts; HBP = Times hit by a pitch; BK = Balks; WP = Wild pitches; BF = Batters faced

Other pitchers 
Note: W = Wins; L = Losses; W-L% = Win-Loss Percentage; ERA = Earned run average; G = Games pitched; GS = Games started; GF = Games finished; CG = Complete game; SHO = Shutouts; SV = Saves; IP = Innings pitched; HA = Hits allowed; RA = Runs allowed; ER = Earned runs allowed; HRA = Home runs allowed; BB = Base on Balls; IBB = Intentional base on balls; SO = Strikeouts; HBP = Times hit by a pitch; BK = Balks; WP = Wild pitches; BF = Batters faced

Relief pitchers 
Note: W = Wins; L = Losses; W-L% = Win-Loss Percentage; ERA = Earned run average; G = Games pitched; GS = Games started; GF = Games finished; CG = Complete game; SHO = Shutouts; SV = Saves; IP = Innings pitched; HA = Hits allowed; RA = Runs allowed; ER = Earned runs allowed; HRA = Home runs allowed; BB = Base on Balls; IBB = Intentional base on balls; SO = Strikeouts; HBP = Times hit by a pitch; BK = Balks; WP = Wild pitches; BF = Batters faced

Fielding 
Note: G = Games played; GS = Games started; CG = Complete game; Inn = Innings played in field; Ch = Defensive Chances; PO = Putouts; A = Assists; E = Errors committed; DP = Double plays turned; Fld% = Fielding percentage; PB = Passed balls; WP = Wild pitches; SB = Stolen bases; CS = Caught stealing; CS% = Caught stealing percentage; PO = Pickoffs; Pos Summary = Positions played

1963 World Series

Game 1 
October 2, 1963, at Yankee Stadium in New York

Game 2 
October 3, 1963, at Yankee Stadium in New York

Game 3 
October 5, 1963, at Dodger Stadium in Los Angeles

Game 4 
October 6, 1963, at Dodger Stadium in Los Angeles

Awards and honors 

National League Most Valuable Player
Sandy Koufax
National League Cy Young Award
Sandy Koufax
World Series Most Valuable Player
Sandy Koufax
Associated Press Athlete of the Year
Sandy Koufax

All-Stars 
1963 Major League Baseball All-Star Game
Tommy Davis starter
Don Drysdale reserve
Sandy Koufax reserve
Maury Wills reserve

Sporting News 
TSN Major League Manager of the Year Award
Walter Alston
TSN Pitcher of the Year Award
Sandy Koufax
TSN Major League Player of the Year Award
Sandy Koufax
TSN National League All-Star
Tommy Davis
Sandy Koufax
Jim Gilliam

Farm system

Notes

References 
Baseball-Reference season page
Baseball Almanac season page

External links 
1963 Los Angeles Dodgers uniform
Los Angeles Dodgers official web site

Los Angeles Dodgers seasons
Los Angeles Dodgers season
National League champion seasons
World Series champion seasons
Los Angel